The 2010 South Dakota gubernatorial election was held on November 2, 2010 to elect the Governor of South Dakota to a four-year term. Incumbent Republican Governor Mike Rounds was ineligible to run for re-election due to term limits.

Republican candidate Dennis Daugaard was elected, defeating Democratic candidate Scott Heidepriem.

Republican primary

Candidates

Dennis Daugaard, Lieutenant Governor
Gordon Howie, State Senator
Dave Knudson, State Senate Majority Leader
Ken Knuppe, rancher
Scott Munsterman, former mayor of Brookings

Results

Democratic primary

Candidate

Scott Heidepriem, State Senate Minority Leader

Results
Heidepriem faced no opposition in the Democratic primary.

General election

Predictions

Polling

Results

References

External links
Elections & Voter Registration at South Dakota Secretary of State
Candidates for South Dakota State Offices at Project Vote Smart
Campaign contributions for 2010 South Dakota Governor from Follow the Money
South Dakota Governor 2010 from OurCampaigns.com
2010 South Dakota General Election graph of multiple polls from Pollster.com
Election 2010: South Dakota Governor from Rasmussen Reports
2010 South Dakota Governor – Daugaard vs. Heidepriem from Real Clear Politics
2010 South Dakota Governor's Race from CQ Politics
Race Profile in The New York Times
Official campaign websites (Archived)
Dennis Daugaard
Scott Heidepriem
Gordon Howie
Dave Knudson
Ken Knuppe
Scott Munsterman

Governor
2010
South Dakota